The 1st full-length album of Hatesex.

Track listing
"The Crown of Inhuman"– 3:10
"Hatesex (Reborn)"– 6:16
"Subculture Queen"– 3:06
"The Clockwork Heart"– 4:21
"Stepdaughter of the Vainglory Empire"– 3:55
"Blue Zygote"– 4:17
"The Greed of Our Stare"– 5:07
"Black Magic"– 6:09
"Spiritual Palsy"– 3:44
"Unwant"– 3:23
"The Vapor Chariot"– 3:37

Info

 All songs recorded and mixed Bari-Bari except for where noted.
 Lyrics on "Spiritual Palsy" written by Benn Ra and Krisanna Marie
 Lyrics on "Unwant," and "The Vapor Chariot" written by Benn Ra
 Additional Vocals on "Unwant" by Benn Ra
 Album artwork by Benn Ra
 Lead vocals on "Black Magic" by Martin Eric Ain of Celtic Frost.
 Lead guitar solo on "Black Magic" by Erol Unala (Apollyon Sun/Ex-Celtic Frost)
 Drums on "The Vapor Chariot" by Tony Havoc (Scarlet's Remains)
 Martin and Erol's tracks were produced my Tom G. Fischer at the Bunker in Zurich, Switzerland.
 Bass guitar on "BlueZygote" by Carl Tapia.

Notes
 "Hatesex (Reborn)" is a version of a song by one of Benn's previous bands, The Secular.
 "Black Magic" was originally performed by Slayer.

References
 Hatesex Discography Info

2005 albums
Alice In... albums